The Chinese Association for International Understanding (CAFIU) is a Beijing-based organization, registered under the Ministry of Civil Affairs, that is reported to be a front organization for the International Liaison Department of the Chinese Communist Party (CCP) used for international exchanges with academics, think tanks, and other civil society organizations. CAFIU is reported to have links to the Political Work Department of the Central Military Commission. 

CAFIU's president is Ji Bingxuan and its vice president is Ai Ping, former vice minister of the CCP's International Liaison Department. Yan Junqi, a former vice chairwoman of the National People's Congress, is a past president of the organization. Zhou Tienong served as a director of the organization. The organization publishes a journal titled International Understanding.

Activity 

In the 1990s, CAFIU assisted efforts by the Chinese Communist Party and the People's Liberation Army to gain access to members of the United States Congress. CAFIU hosts events in support of the Belt and Road Initiative and One-China principle.

Scrutiny by governments 
On September 3, 2020, the Indian government listed the CAFIU as an "entity of concern" and ordered tighter scrutiny of visa requests by CAFIU members, stating that it operates influence operations that run counter to national interests.

See also 

 China Association for International Friendly Contact
Chinese information operations and information warfare
Political warfare

References

External links 
 

1981 establishments in China
People's Republic of China friendship associations
Organizations associated with the Chinese Communist Party
Chinese intelligence agencies
Information operations units and formations
People's Liberation Army General Political Department